Chira may refer to:

 Chira (spider), a genus of spiders
 Chira language, an extinct Catacaoan language of the Piura Region of Peru
 Can de Chira, a dog originated from Aragon, Spain
 Flattened rice, a type of jolpan in Indian cuisine

Places 
 Chira, Lebanon, a village in Koura District
 Chira County, a county in Hotan, Xinjiang, China
 Chira Island, Costa Rican Pacific island located at the upper end of the Gulf of Nicoya
 Chira River, a river in northern Peru
 Sreeraman Chira, a fresh water lake in Kerala state in India

People 
 Alexander Chira (1897–1983), bishop of the Ruthenian Catholic Church
 Susan Chira, American journalist
 Chira Apostol (born 1960), former Romanian rower
 Chira Prabandhayodhin (born 1939), Thai former sports shooter
 Chira Ratanarat (born 1940), chief executive officer of The Siam Chemicals Public Company

See also
 Río Chira (disambiguation)
 
 
 Chiras (disambiguation)
 Chirui River (disambiguation)
 Chir (disambiguation)